Frisco Peak is a summit near the north‑center edge of Beaver County, Utah, United States.

Description
The peak, elevation , is located within the San Francisco Mountains range and is the highest peak within the range. It looks over the Wah Wah Valley to the west. Because of its relative location and elevation, it is the site of multiple radio transmission facilities.

The name of the peak is a contraction of the mountain range in which it is located.

See also

 List of mountains in Utah

References

Mountains of Utah
Mountains of Beaver County, Utah